Evelina Källhage (born 20 April 1997) is a Swedish handball player who plays for Önnereds HK.

Achievements 
SHE: 
Silver Medalist: 2018 and 2021

References

1997 births
Living people
Handball players from Gothenburg
Swedish female handball players
21st-century Swedish women